The Addams Family is an American macabre/black comedy sitcom based on Charles Addams's New Yorker cartoons. The 30-minute television series was responsible for taking the unnamed characters in the single-panel gag cartoons and giving them names, back stories, and a household setting. It was spearheaded by David Levy, who created and developed the series with Donald Saltzman in cooperation with cartoonist Addams, who gave each character a name and description for the first time. The series was shot in black-and-white, airing for two seasons on ABC from September 18, 1964, to April 8, 1966, for a total of 64 episodes. The show's opening theme was composed and sung by Vic Mizzy.

The show was originally produced by head writer Nat Perrin for Filmways, Inc., at General Service Studios in Hollywood, California. Metro-Goldwyn-Mayer now owns the rights to the series.

Premise
The Addams family is a close-knit extended family with decidedly macabre interests and supernatural abilities, though no explanation for their powers is explicitly given in the series. The wealthy, endlessly enthusiastic Gomez Addams is madly in love with his refined wife, Morticia. Along with their daughter Wednesday, their son Pugsley, Uncle Fester, and Grandmama, they reside at 0001 Cemetery Lane in an ornate, gloomy, Second Empire style mansion. The theme song contains the lyric, "Their house is a museum", which is borne out by the variety of objects in the interior scenes, some of which are collector's items and others of which are only bizarre (such as the mounted swordfish head with a human leg protruding from the mouth and a stuffed two-headed giant tortoise) all props that were stolen once the series was cancelled.

The family is attended by their servants - towering butler Lurch, and Thing, a hand that appears from within wooden boxes and other places. Other relatives who made recurring appearances included Cousin Itt, Morticia's older sister Ophelia, and Morticia's mother Grandma Frump.

Much of the humor derives from the Addamses' culture clash with the rest of the world. They invariably treat normal visitors with great warmth and courtesy, even when the guests express confusion, fear, and dismay at the decor of the house and the sight of Lurch and Thing. Some visitors have bad intentions, which the family generally ignores, and suffer no harm. The Addamses are puzzled by the horrified reactions to their own good-natured and (to them) normal behavior. Accordingly, they view "conventional" tastes with generally tolerant suspicion. Almost invariably, visitors to the Addamses want to leave and never come back.

Episodes

For both seasons, episodes aired Friday nights at 8:30 pm.

The Addams Family members

Pets
 Aristotle – Pugsley's pet octopus
 Cleopatra – Morticia's pet African strangler (a type of man-eating plant)
 Fang – Pugsley's pet jaguar
 Homer – Wednesday's pet spider
 Kitty Kat – The Addams Family's pet lion, in "The Addams Family Tree", Gomez mentioned that Kitty "can't stand the taste of people." In "Cat Addams", Kitty Kat's dad was claimed to have eaten the father of Dr. Mbogo, which explains why Dr. Mbogo will not treat Kitty Kat.
 Lucifer – Wednesday's pet lizard
 Tristan and Isolde – The Addams Family's pet piranhas
 Zelda – The family's pet vulture

Relatives
These relatives made appearances on the show, but members of the family mentioned other relatives in each of the episodes:

Minor characters

Production

Writing
Series creator David Levy explained the premise of the show to syndicated columnist Erskine Johnson in August 1964: "We have made [the family] full-bodied people, not monsters ... They are not grotesque and hideous manifestations. At the same time we are protecting the images of [Charles] Addams' 'children', as he refers to them. We are living up to the spirit of his cartoons. He is more than just a cartoonist. He's a social commentator and a great wit." The tone was set by series producer Nat Perrin, who was a close friend of Groucho Marx's and writer of several Marx Brothers films. Perrin created story ideas, directed one episode, and rewrote every script. The series often employed the same type of zany satire and screwball humor seen in the Marx Brothers films, in addition to wordplay, physical comedy, and occasionally slapstick. One running gag labeled people who were not members of the family as "strange" or complained of their behavior. Another one was members of the family trading objects when they collided; in "Cousin Itt and the Vocational Counselor", Gomez ends up with Morticia's knitting and Morticia has his cigar. Other running jokes were about strange food and drink, e.g. toadstools and hemlock; bats, the dungeon, the cemetery, and other "creepy" things; and Gomez's glee at losing money on the stock market. It lampooned politics ("Gomez, the Politician" and "Gomez, the People's Choice"); modern art ("Art and the Addams Family" and Morticia's painting in several episodes); Shakespeare and other literature ("My Fair Cousin Itt", and other episodes); the legal system ("The Addams Family in Court"); royalty ("Morticia Meets Royalty"); rock n' roll and Beatlemania ("Lurch, the Teenage Idol").

The Hall of Languages building at Syracuse University served as creative inspiration for the Addams Family home.

The Addams Family debuted at the same time as The Munsters, another black-and-white, macabre-themed family sitcom. To distinguish themselves from the competition, both shows avoided casting guest stars who had appeared on the other series, and John Astin argued in interviews that the two shows are fundamentally different, since the Munsters were physically monsters, but completely normal in every other respect, whereas the Addamses were normal looking, but highly eccentric. Despite this, the general public perceived the two shows as virtually interchangeable, and has continued to do so in the decades since they were both cancelled.

Opening theme

The ABC network originally wanted to save money by using prerecorded library production music for the series, but producer David Levy insisted on hiring Vic Mizzy as composer. The show's theme, written and arranged by longtime Hollywood composer Vic Mizzy, is dominated by a harpsichord and a bass harmonica. Mizzy first improvised the iconic finger snaps when he presented his composition for approval, they worked so well they became part of the percussive accompaniment. Ted Cassidy punctuated the lyrics with the words "neat", "sweet", and "petite". Mizzy's theme was released by RCA Victor as a 45-rpm single, although it failed to chart in the U.S. The song was revived for the 1992 animated series, as well as in 2007 for a series of Addams Family television commercials for M&M's chocolates. 

When The Addams Family was first brought to the big screen, the studio was not going to use the theme. Audience tests proved that the appeal was too great to delete it. It was also revisited in the dance scene in Addams Family Values.

The closing theme is similar, but is instrumental and features such instruments as a triangle, a woodblock, a siren whistle, and a duck call replacing some of the finger snaps.

Broadcast syndication
The show has aired worldwide. In the United Kingdom, it aired on ITV from 1965 to 1966, on Channel 4 on Friday evenings from 1984 to 1985, and on Sky 1 from 1991 to 1992. It was aired on BBC Two at 6 pm on Monday nights from February 1992 until the end of 1993, on Saturdays in 1994, and later during school summer holidays before leaving the air at the end of August 1996.

In October 2011, the series was picked up by Cartoon Network's sister channel Boomerang and ran from October of that year for Halloween alongside The Munsters until Halloween 2013.
It aired on select local stations and on Antenna TV until December 30, 2017.

As of November 2020, the series airs on FETV.

As of May 2021, the show airs on MeTV.

Home media
MGM Home Entertainment (distributed by 20th Century Fox Home Entertainment) has released The Addams Family on DVD in Region 1, 2 and 4 in three-volume sets.

Streaming
As of April 2019, the series can be purchased on iTunes, and can be streamed in the United States via Amazon Video and IMDb. The minisodes are available on Crackle and Vudu. The show also has a dedicated channel on Pluto TV.

Soundtrack 
A soundtrack album was released in 1965 containing all of Vic Mizzy's compositions for the series entitled Original Music From The Addams Family.

Reunions, sequels and adaptations
In 1972, the third episode of the Saturday morning animated series The New Scooby-Doo Movies featured the Addams Family. Astin, Jones, Coogan, and Cassidy all reprised their roles; 11-year-old Jodie Foster provided the voice of Pugsley. This episode was the pilot for the 1973 animated series. Coogan and Cassidy were the only original series cast members who returned for this series. Jodie Foster also returned as the voice of Pugsley. 

A reunion TV film, Halloween with the New Addams Family, aired on NBC in October 1977 and starred all of the original cast, except for Blossom Rock, who was very ill at the time and was replaced as Grandmama by Phyllis actress Jane Rose. Elvia Allman portrayed Mother Frump, whom Margaret Hamilton had played in the original series. Veteran character actors Parley Baer and Vito Scotti, who both had recurring roles in the original series, also appeared in the movie. The film also included extended family members created specifically for this production, such as Gomez's brother Pancho (played by Henry Darrow) and two additional children, Wednesday Jr. and Pugsley Jr. The latter two were portrayed as near copies of the original children, now known as Wednesday Sr. and Pugsley Sr., who were once again played respectively by Lisa Loring and Ken Weatherwax, the original Wednesday and Pugsley in the series. Vic Mizzy rewrote and conducted the series theme as an instrumental.

Astin reprised his role as Gomez Addams for the 1992 animated adaptation of the series. Weatherwax and Loring, the only other original cast members still living at the time, did not participate.

In 1998, a standalone film, Addams Family Reunion, aired on the Fox Family Channel, followed by the series The New Addams Family that ran from 1998 to 2000. Astin appeared in the series as Grandpapa Addams.

In other media

Film

A successful film, The Addams Family, was released by Paramount Pictures in 1991, starring Raul Julia as Gomez, Anjelica Huston as Morticia, Christopher Lloyd as an amnesiac Uncle Fester, and Christina Ricci as Wednesday. After the film's release, series creator David Levy filed a lawsuit against Paramount Pictures; the suit was settled out of court. A sequel, Addams Family Values, followed in 1993, to greater critical success than the first film, though it earned less at the box office.

References

External links 

 
 

1960s black comedy television series
1960s American horror comedy television series
The Addams Family television series
American fantasy television series
1960s American sitcoms
1964 American television series debuts
1966 American television series endings
American Broadcasting Company original programming
Black-and-white American television shows
English-language television shows
Fantasy comedy television series
Single-camera television sitcoms
Television shows based on comic strips
Television series by MGM Television
Television series about families
Witchcraft in television
Television series by Filmways